Hippocampus biocellatus, or the false-eyed seahorse, is a synonym of Hippocampus planifrons, Peters, 1877.

References 

biocellatus
Fish described in 2001